Gong Chunjie (born 2 August 1998) is a Chinese footballer currently playing as a right-back for Kunshan.

Club career
Gong Chunjie would be part of the Shanghai Lucky Star Youth Training program before joining Chinese Super League side Shanghai Port who loaned him out to third tier club Kunshan for the 2018 China League Two campaign. His loan would be extended for the following season and he would be part of the team that gained promotion to the second tier at the end of the 2019 China League Two campaign. His loan would go on to become a permanent transfer and would go on to establish himself as regular within the team that won the division and promotion to the top tier at the end of the 2022 China League One campaign.

Career statistics
.

Honours

Club 
Kunshan
 China League One: 2022

References

External links
Gong Chunjie at Worldfootball.net

1998 births
Living people
Chinese footballers
China youth international footballers
Association football defenders
China League Two players
China League One players
Shanghai Port F.C. players
Kunshan F.C. players